
Robert Blanché (1898–1975) was an associate professor of philosophy at the University of Toulouse. He wrote many books addressing the philosophy of mathematics.

About Structures intellectuelles 

Robert Blanché died in 1975. Nine years before, in 1966, he published with Vrin: Structures intellectuelles. Therein, he deals with the logical hexagon. Whereas the logical square or square of Apuleius represents four values: A,E,I,O , the logical hexagon represents six, that is to say, not only A,E,I,O but also two new values: Y and U. It is advisable to read the article: logical hexagon as well what concerns Indian logic.

In La Logique et son histoire d' Aristote à Russell, published with Armand Colin in 1970, Robert Blanché, the author of Structures intellectuelles (Vrin, 1966) mentions that Józef Maria Bocheński speaks of a sort of Indian logical triangle to be compared with the square of Aristotle (or square of Apuleius), in other words with the square of opposition.

Works 
La Notion de fait psychique, essai sur les rapports du physique et du mental – 1934, ed. PUF.
Le Rationalisme de Whewell – 1935, ed. PUF.
Whewell : de la construction de la science – 1938, ed. J. Vrin
La Science physique et la réalité : réalisme, positivisme, mathématisme - 1948, ed. PUF
Les Attitudes idéalistes – 1949, ed. PUF
L’Axiomatique – 1955, ed. P.U.F. coll. Quadrige, 112p.
Introduction à la logique contemporaine - 1957, ed. Armand Colin, coll Cursus, 205p.
Structures intellectuelles, essai sur l’organisation systématique des concepts - 1966, ed. J. Vrin
Raison et discours, défense de la logique réflexive – 1967, ed. J. Vrin
La science actuelle et le rationalisme - 1967, Ed. PUF.
La Méthode expérimentale et la philosophie de la physique – 1969, ed. Armand Collin, 384p
La logique et son histoire d’Aristote à Russell, ed. Amand Colin, coll. U, Paris, 1970, 366p.
La Logique et son histoire, (avec Jacques Dubucs), ed. Amand Colin, coll. U, Paris, 1996, 396p. (édition revue de 1970)
L’Épistémologie - 1972 ; ed. PUF
Le Raisonnement – 1973, ed. PUF
L’Induction scientifique et les lois naturelles – 1975, ed. PUF

References
 Biography on Larousse

1898 births
1975 deaths
Philosophers of mathematics
Academic staff of the University of Toulouse
French male non-fiction writers
20th-century French philosophers
20th-century French male writers